Maryka Holtzhausen (born 2 June 1987) is a former South African netball player. She played in the positions of GA and WA. She was a member of the South Africa national netball team, and competed in the 2010 Commonwealth Games in Delhi and the 2011 World Netball Championships in Singapore. She also participated in the 2010 World Netball Series and the 2011 World Netball Series, both held in Liverpool, UK. She played in the 2012 Quad Series, and in the same year, she won a bronze medal in 2012 Fast5 Netball World Series with the Fast5 Proteas.

Holtzhausen was the first player from her country to line up in the UK's leading competition, the Netball Superleague, joining Loughborough Lightning for the 2015 season. She has also played for Free State Crinums and Spar Proteas She's played for Severn Stars for the 2018 season and she'll be back for the 2019 season. 

In November 2018 Holtzhausen was the second player in South Africa national netball team history to receive her 100th cap.

References

External links
 Netball South Africa official player profile. Retrieved on 2011-11-29.
 Maryka Holtzhausen player profile, Netball England website. Retrieved on 2011-11-29.
 'Netball Team Changes', 16 November 2011. Retrieved 2011-11-29.

South African netball players
South African people of German descent
Afrikaner people
University of the Free State alumni
Netball Superleague players
Commonwealth Games competitors for South Africa
Netball players at the 2010 Commonwealth Games
Netball players at the 2014 Commonwealth Games
Netball players at the 2018 Commonwealth Games
1987 births
Living people
2019 Netball World Cup players
South African expatriate netball people in England
Loughborough Lightning netball players
Severn Stars players
2011 World Netball Championships players
2015 Netball World Cup players